Patricia McCormick (born May 23, 1956) is an American journalist and writer of realistic fiction for young adults. She has twice been a finalist for the National Book Award.

Career
McCormick graduated from Rosemont College in 1974–1978. McCormick earned an MS from the Columbia University Graduate School of Journalism in 1985–1986 and an MFA from the New School in 1999. She currently lives in New York City. McCormick is a frequent contributor to several magazines and newspapers, including The New York Times, Ladies Home Journal, Town & Country, and Reader's Digest.

Her books rely heavily on research and interviews. To write her novel Sold, McCormick traveled to the brothels of India and the mountain villages of Nepal to interview survivors of sex trafficking. For her book Never Fall Down, she spent a month in Cambodia with a survivor of the Khmer Rouge Genocide.

She has worked with Malala Yousafzai, the Pakistani girl who was shot by the Taliban for standing up for her right to an education. The book, I Am Malala : How One Girl Stood Up for Education and Changed the World, was published in 2013.

Works
Cut - PUSH, Scholastic (2000)
My Brother's Keeper - Hyperion Books for Children (2005)
Sold - Hyperion Books for Children (2006) - National Book Award Finalist
Purple Heart - HarperCollins Publishers (2009)
Never Fall Down - (2012) - National Book Award finalist
I am Malala: How One Girl Stood Up for Education and Changed the World (2013)
The Plot to Kill Hitler: Dietrich Bonhoeffer: Pastor, Spy, Unlikely Hero (2016)

Awards, recognition and nominations

In 2002 McCormick's Cut was named one of the ALA Best Books for Young Adults for that year. McCormick won an Editor's Choice Award from Booklist and was a National Book Award Finalist in 2006 for her book Sold.

2000
American Library Association Top Ten Quick Pick 2000
Children's Literature Council's Choice 2000
Children's Literature Council's Choice 2000
Teen People Book-of-the-Month selection 2000
New York Public Library Best Books for the Teenage 2000

2002 
American Library Association Best Book of the Year 2002 

2004, 2006, 2012
New York Public Library Best Books for the Teenage

2006
American Library Association, Top Ten List, Best Books of the Year, 2006
Booklist 2006 Editor's Choice Award
Book Sense Pick, Winter 2006
Chicago Public Library Best of the Best List, 2006
Chicago Tribune Best of the Year, 2006*National Book Award Finalist, 2006
National Public Radio's Best Books of the Year 2006
New York Public Library Best Books for the Teenage 2006
Publishers Weekly, Best 100 Books of 2006

2007
ALA Best Books for Young Adults, 2007
Booklist Top Ten Women's History Books for Youth, 2007
Notable Social Studies Trade Books for Young People, 2007

2008
Gustav-Heinemann Peace Prize 2008

2009
IndieBound Pick, Autumn, 2009
Publishers Weekly, Best 25 Books of 2009

2012
National Book Award (Young People's Literature), finalist, Never Fall Down
 New York Times Notable

References

External links
 Official website
 McCormick at Facebook
Mother Daughter Book Club.com Interview
 

1956 births
American writers of young adult literature
American children's writers
American women journalists
Living people
Columbia University Graduate School of Journalism alumni
The New School alumni
Place of birth missing (living people)
Women writers of young adult literature
21st-century American women